Single White Female is a 1992 American psychological erotic thriller film based on John Lutz's 1990 novel SWF Seeks Same. It stars Bridget Fonda and Jennifer Jason Leigh and was directed by Barbet Schroeder. Recently estranged Allison Jones (Fonda) begins to rent an apartment room to Hedra Carlson (Leigh). After she reconciles with her ex-boyfriend, she finds strange patterns of behavior in her tenant.

Plot
New York City software designer Allison "Allie" Jones is engaged to Sam Rawson. Sam's ex-wife calls, and when it is revealed that he slept with her recently, Allie throws him out, breaking off their engagement, and her neighbor, aspiring actor Graham Knox, comforts her. The next morning, Allie attends a business lunch with Mitchell Myerson, a fashion house owner looking to buy Allie's revolutionary new program. He manipulates her into significantly reducing the price; as he is her first and only client, she accepts.

Allie advertises for a new roommate to share her apartment in the Ansonia. She settles on Hedra Carlson, whom she nicknames "Hedy", and they become friends. Hedy explains that her twin was stillborn, leaving her constantly lonely. Hedy becomes overly protective of Allie, erasing Sam's voice-mail asking Allie to reconcile with him. She buys a puppy named Buddy to bond with Allie, but becomes jealous when Sam wins Allie back and they seek a new apartment for themselves. Perceiving Allie as having rejected her, Hedy is upset and becomes further frustrated when Buddy does not come to her even when she coaxes him. Allie and Sam later find Buddy's corpse on the ground below her apartment's window. Returning to the apartment, Allie sees that the window was open with a gap wide enough for Buddy to get through. Hedy claims that Buddy's death was an accident because she had thought the bars outside the window had been fixed.

Mitchell tries to coerce Allie into performing fellatio on him upon completing their deal, threatening to warn off future clients and not pay her, but she fights back and escapes. To comfort Allie, Hedy takes her to get a haircut, but after Hedy appears dressed exactly like her, including her haircut, Allie is unnerved. That night, Allie follows Hedy to an underground nightclub and witnesses Hedy masquerading as Allie. Allie finds a shoebox containing letters addressed to Ellen Besch – Hedy's real name – along with a letter from Sam to Allie, and a newspaper clipping on the accidental drowning of Hedy's twin sister Judy when she was nine years old.

Allie tells Graham the truth about Hedy, both of them unaware Hedy is listening. Allie leaves, and Hedy attacks Graham. When Sam returns the following night, Hedy impersonates Allie and begins to perform oral sex on him, but when he realizes it isn't Allie, he asks her to stop. Hedy ignores Sam and sexually assaults him, after which he realizes that Allie was right about Hedy. Hedy begs him to leave Allie alone, but he refuses and insists on telling Allie the truth. Furious, Hedy kills him by gouging his eye with her stiletto heel.

Hedy tells Allie she is about to leave. Seeing a news report on Sam's death, Allie realizes what has happened and tries to leave herself, but Hedy takes her hostage at gunpoint, explaining that everyone will believe Allie killed Sam. To "protect" Allie, Hedy tries to convince her that they must run away. While booking a flight online to Los Angeles, Allie attempts to attract help by turning up the volume on her television to a disruptive level, but Hedy catches her.

Mitchell notices his files being erased (a security program initiated by late payments), and rushes to find Allie. He finds her bound and gagged with duct tape, but while he attempts to free Allie, Hedy shoots and kills him. Hedy then tries to persuade Allie to commit suicide via drug overdose, but Allie resists. Hedy points the gun at Allie as she tries to run, begging Allie not to leave her. Allie coldly replies, "I'm not like your sister, Hedy. Not anymore. I'm like you now." Graham regains consciousness and assists Allie. Allie drags Hedy off him and flees, but Hedy shoots her in the shoulder. After seemingly strangling Allie to death, Hedy drags her towards the incinerator, but Allie recovers and escapes. Screaming for Allie to come out, Hedy lashes out at a mirror inside a closet. Allie stabs her in the back with a screwdriver, and they struggle before a horrified and saddened Allie watches as Hedy dies.

In an epilogue, Allie narrates that she has finally moved on. She forgives Hedy for killing Sam, and tries to forgive herself for Hedy's death, stating that Hedy's downfall is an example of how survivor's guilt can destroy a person. The film finishes with a photo of both Allie and Hedy's faces combined into one.

Cast
 Bridget Fonda as Allison "Allie" Jones
 Jennifer Jason Leigh as Hedra "Hedy" Carlson / Ellen Besch
 Steven Weber as Sam Rawson
 Peter Friedman as Graham Knox
 Stephen Tobolowsky as Mitchell Myerson
 Frances Bay as Elderly Neighbor
 Jessica Lundy as Talkative Applicant
 Ken Tobey as Desk Clerk

Production
The Ansonia on New York City's Upper West Side was used for the exterior shots of the apartment block.

Following a poor test screening, the ending was reshot.

Reception

Box office 
The film debuted at No. 2 at the US box office on its opening weekend behind Unforgiven, and grossed $48 million at the box office in the United States and Canada. It grossed $36 million overseas for a worldwide total of $84 million.

Critical response 
On review aggregator Rotten Tomatoes, the film holds an approval rating of 53% based on 49 reviews, with an average rating of 5.30/10. The site's critics consensus states: "Single White Female benefits from a pair of outstanding leads, neither of whom are well served by a storyline that wavers between thrillingly tense and utterly ridiculous."  Audiences polled by CinemaScore gave the film an average grade of "B−" on an A+ to F scale.

Roger Ebert gave the film three stars out of four with the comment, "No genre is beyond redemption or beneath contempt, and here the slasher genre is given its due with strong performances and direction."  He also questioned why the character Hedra had been given such an unusual name.

Jennifer Jason Leigh won a MTV Movie Award for Best Villain, and was also nominated for a Chicago Film Critics Association Award for Best Actress.

The character of Hedy has been cited as an example of borderline personality disorder. She suffers from a markedly disturbed sense of identity, and tries to remedy it by adopting the wholesome attributes of her roommate. It is implied that she feels a deep-seated emptiness, while her fear of abandonment leads to drastic measures.

Sequel
The film was followed by a 2005 direct to video sequel, Single White Female 2: The Psycho, starring Kristen Miller, Allison Lange and Brooke Burns.

Home media
Single White Female was released on VHS and LaserDisc in January 1993 from Sony Pictures Home Entertainment, and eventually on DVD in February 1998. The film was released on Blu-ray from Scream Factory on November 13, 2018, featuring new interviews with director Barbet Schroeder, actors Steven Weber and Peter Friedman and screenwriter Don Roos, an audio commentary from Schroeder, editor Lee Percy and associate producer Susan Hoffman, and a theatrical trailer.

As of December 2016, NBC was developing a television adaptation of the film.

See also

 List of films featuring home invasions

References

External links
 
 
 
 Movie stills

1992 drama films
1992 films
1990s English-language films
1990s erotic films
1990s psychological thriller films
1990s thriller drama films
American erotic thriller films
American LGBT-related films
American psychological thriller films
American thriller drama films
Borderline personality disorder in fiction
Columbia Pictures films
Films about murderers
Films about stalking
Films about twins
Films based on American novels
Films based on thriller novels
Films directed by Barbet Schroeder
Films produced by Barbet Schroeder
Films scored by Howard Shore
Films set in apartment buildings
Films set in Manhattan
Films set in New York City
Films shot in Los Angeles
Films shot in New York City
Films with screenplays by Don Roos
Home invasions in film
LGBT-related drama films
LGBT-related thriller films
1990s American films